Laira Bridge is a disused railway bridge that crosses the River Plym in the city of Plymouth, Devon, England. In 2015, it was refurbished to carry a pedestrian and cycle path.

The name is also used to refer to the road bridge that runs alongside and carries the A379 road.

History 
The bridge carried the London and South Western Railway branch to Turnchapel over the River Plym in Devon. The bridge was built by Messrs Relf and Pethick after being authorised by an act of parliament in 1883. It was completed by 1887, and was opened in July 1892.

Passenger trains ceased to use it when the passenger services to Turnchapel and Yealmpton were terminated in the 1950s, but the bridge remained in use to serve the Associated Portland Cement works. It finally closed to traffic in the 1990s.

Refurbishment 
In 2015, the bridge was restored at a cost of £3.5 million in order to turn it into a cycle and pedestrian pathway. The work was due for completion by Spring 2015. Phase 1 was completed in May 2015. The path will link into existing footpaths and cycleways including Route 27 of the National Cycle Network. The bridge will link existing off road cycle paths which join Devonport and Stonehouse in the west to Plymstock and Plympton in the east. Funding came from a number of sources including a £750,000 developer contribution from the Saltram Meadow development and from the government's local sustainable transport fund.

References

Railway bridges in Devon
Bridges completed in 1887